Melvin Yovany Valladares Castillo (born 14 July 1984) is a Honduran football striker who currently plays for F.C. Motagua in the Honduran Liga Nacional.

Club career
Valladares made his professional debut for Municipal Valencia on 6 August 2004 against Real España before joining Real España himself after the 2005 Apertura. He would score 14 goals for them over a 5 year-period. In November 2009, he went on a trial with Tottenham Hotspur after being recommended by Wilson Palacios.

In 2010, he moved abroad to play for Mexican second division side Guerreros and left them in summer 2011 for Dorados.

He joined Motagua before the 2012 Clausura.

International career
Valladares made his debut for Honduras in a March 2007 friendly match against El Salvador and has, as of March 2013, earned a total of 14 caps, scoring 2 goals. He has represented his country in 2 FIFA World Cup qualification match and played at the 2009 CONCACAF Gold Cup.

His most recent international was an April 2010 friendly match against Venezuela.

International goals

References

External links

1984 births
Living people
Sportspeople from Tegucigalpa
Association football forwards
Honduran footballers
Honduras international footballers
2009 CONCACAF Gold Cup players
F.C. Municipal Valencia players
Real C.D. España players
Dorados de Sinaloa footballers
F.C. Motagua players
Honduran expatriate footballers
Expatriate footballers in Mexico
Liga Nacional de Fútbol Profesional de Honduras players